Fates and Furies (2015) is the third novel by the American author Lauren Groff.

Background 
Fates and Furies takes place in New York and examines how different people in a relationship can have disparate views on the relationship. According to Groff, she originally envisioned the novel as two separate books, but she was encouraged by her agent to rewrite them as one integrated work. The novel is influenced by Greek Mythology; deities and vengeance are themes throughout.

Reception
Fates and Furies was nominated for a National Book Award. The book received extensive press attention, including from Carrie Brownstein, Sarah Jessica Parker, and President Obama, who said he enjoyed the book more than anything else he had read that year. The novel was also compared to Gillian Flynn's thriller Gone Girl.

Positive reviews noted the novel as "masterful", while negative reviews focused on moments of implausibility in the novel's second half.

References

2015 American novels
Books with cover art by Rodrigo Corral
Novels set in New York City
Vegetarianism in fiction
Novels by Lauren Groff
Riverhead Books books